Bridge d'Italia is the official magazine for the Italian contract bridge game federation, Federazione Italiana Gioco Bridge (FIGB). It has been published since January 1938.

History and profile
The magazine was first published in January 1938 under the title Bollettino Mensile (Monthly Bulletin). In November that year the title was changed by the Fascist administration to the Monthly Bulletin of the Italian Ponte Association. Between December 1941 and 1946 the magazine temporarily ceased publication due to World War II. In 1946 the magazine could publish only one issue with the title Bridge, and from 1947 its frequency was made monthly. In 1953 the magazine was renamed as Bridge d'Italia of which editor-in-chief was Cesare Guglielmetti. The other editors-in-chief were Luigi Firbo who succeeded Cesare Guglielmetti in 1957 and held the post until June 1970 when Guido Barbone was appointed to the post. From April 1986 Riccardo Vandoni was made the editor-in-chief of the magazine.
 
Bridge d'Italia has a print and an online edition. The print edition is published ten times a year. The magazine is headquartered in Milan.

See also
 The Bridge World
 List of contract bridge magazines

References

External links
 FIGB website (Italian)
 Online edition

1938 establishments in Italy
Contract bridge magazines
Italian-language magazines
Magazines established in 1938
Magazines published in Milan
Monthly magazines published in Italy
Ten times annually magazines